Mohammed bin Rashid Al Maktoum Solar Park is a solar park spread over a total area of 77 km2 in Saih Al-Dahal, about 50 kilometers south of the city of Dubai. It is one of the world's largest renewable projects based on an independent power producer (IPP) model. Besides solar farms using PV technology, the long-term project will also include concentrating solar power (CSP). The total capacity of the entire project is planned to reach 3,000 megawatts.

The 200-megawatt second phase of the project drew global attention as the winning bid of the tender set a new record-low tariff of only US ¢5.89 per kilowatt-hour. This is about 20% lower than any previous, unsubsidized power purchase agreement (PPA) the world has seen before. The PPA is set to a 25-year time frame.

The plant was implemented by the Dubai Electricity and Water Authority (DEWA). The first phase of the project was commissioned on 22 October 2013. At the end of 2020 the solar PV complex reached a generating capacity of 1.013 GW with the aim to reach 5GW by 2030. Currently the 4th (700 MW CSP + 250 MW PV) and 5th phase (900 MW PV) are under construction.

Thanks to a storage capacity of up to 15 hours, the plant can produce day and night.

History
The solar park was announced by Mohammed bin Rashid Al Maktoum in January 2012.

Phase 1 
The first phase of the park was a 13 MWp solar farm (DEWA 13) constructed by First Solar. It was commissioned on 22 October 2013. It uses 152,880 FS-385 black CdTe modules and generates about 28 GWh per year which corresponds to a capacity factor of 24.6%.

Phase 2 
The second phase is a 200 MWp photovoltaic plant built at a cost of US$320 million by a consortium led by ACWA Power and Spanish company TSK. The second phase was scheduled to be commissioned by April 2017. It was completed ahead of time, and commissioned on 22 March 2017. TSK served as the primary contractor for the project, while ACWA Power will operate the plant. The phase includes 2.3 million photovoltaic solar panels spread over an area of 4.5 km2. ACWA Power secured a 27-year debt financing loan worth $344 million from the First Gulf Bank, the National Commercial Bank and the Samba Financial Group. The plant uses First Solar's CdTe modules.

The 200 MWp second phase of the project caused worldwide attention, as the winning bid of the tender set a new record-low tariff of only US ¢5.89 per kilowatt-hour. This is about 20% lower than any previous, unsubsidized power purchase agreement (PPA) the world has seen before. The PPA is set to a 25-year time frame. Assuming the same capacity factor as for phase 1 (24.6%) the annual production will be approximately 430 GWh/yr.

Phase 3 
In April 2015, Dubai Electricity and Water Authority (DEWA) publicly announced the third phase of 800 MWp. A consortium led by Abu Dubai Future Energy Company (Masdar) was awarded the contract for phase three in June 2016. The third phase was completed in 2020.

Phase 4 
The characteristics of the 4th phase of the solar park changed several times during its conception. Originally, DEWA released a request for the Expression of Interest (EOI) for a 200 MWe CSP project in October 2016 and announced the winning bid at 9.45 US cents/kWh purchase price in June 2017. Three months later in September 2017 the final project was revealed at 700 MWe consisting of 600 MWe parabolic trough and a 100 MWe  solar power tower both featuring large molten-salt thermal energy storage, while pointing out the record breaking purchase price of 7.30 US cents/kWh. However, analysts highlight that factors such as very low financing cost and an extraordinary long 35 year PPA contributed to this very low figure. Later in 2018 it was announced that 250 MW of solar PV would be added to the project  now named Noor Energy 1.
The solar power tower completed in 2020 is the tallest in the world standing at 262.44 m (861 ft) just 2.44m above the 260m tower completed in 2017 at the Ashalim Power Station in Israel. The 4th phase aimes to finish by 2022.

Phase 5 
On November 21, 2019, DEWA announced the selection of ACWA Power and Gulf Investment Corporation as preferred EPC and financer respectively, to build and operate the fifth phase, a 900 MW solar power plant based on photovoltaic technology. The plant is scheduled to be commissioned in 2021.

Phase by phase project execution table

See also
 Solar power in the United Arab Emirates

References

Solar power stations in the United Arab Emirates
Energy infrastructure completed in 2013
2013 establishments in the United Arab Emirates